The 1977 Pittsburgh Steelers season was the franchise's 45th in the National Football League. After what was considered the franchise's greatest season ever in 1976, the 1977 Pittsburgh Steelers failed to improve on their 10-4 record from 1976 and finished with a 9-5 record, however they appeared in the playoffs for their 6th straight season and won the AFC Central again. They had a hard time for most of the season as their record hovered around .500. Even the Steel curtain seemed to have a little wear and tear allowing 243 points on the season, more than 100 more than the previous season. The sloppy plays would catch up with them in the Divisional Playoffs when they were knocked off by the Broncos 34–21 in Denver.

The 1977 season is remembered as one of the most turbulent in franchise history, as numerous players were involved with off-the-field issues. Defensive tackle Ernie Holmes was arrested for cocaine possession, and despite being found not guilty, lawsuits followed. Head coach Chuck Noll was also subject to a defamation lawsuit, as Oakland Raiders safety George Atkinson sued Noll and the Steelers for a disparaging comment in which Noll called Atkinson part of the "criminal element" in football. Though Atkinson lost the lawsuit, Noll was forced to bring Steelers cornerback Mel Blount into the suit, which upset Blount as he was one of many Steelers players engaged in a contract holdout, with others including linebacker Jack Lambert and safety Glen Edwards. Disputes between these players and Steelers owner Art Rooney were often publicized, and the overall drama played a significant part in the regression of the Steel Curtain defense. This was also the first season that the Steelers wore black face masks on their helmets.

Personnel

Staff

Roster

The Pittsburgh Steelers began the 1977 season looking to improve upon their 10–4 record in 1976; when they lost to the eventual Super Bowl champion Oakland Raiders.

While the Steelers once again won the AFC Central crown, they finished with one fewer win; going 9–5 and losing to the Denver Broncos in the AFC Divisional playoff game at Denver.

Regular season

Schedule

Game summaries

Week 1 (Monday September 19, 1977): vs. San Francisco 49ers 

at Three Rivers Stadium, Pittsburgh, Pennsylvania

 Game time: 9:00 pm EDT
 Game weather: 69 F, wind 9 mph
 Game attendance: 48,046
 Referee: Bernie Ulman
 TV announcers: (ABC) Frank Gifford (play by play), Don Meredith & Howard Cosell (color commentators)

Scoring drives:

 Pittsburgh – Harris 14 run (Gerela kick)
 Pittsburgh – FG Gerela 49
 Pittsburgh – FG Gerela 47
 Pittsburgh – Harris 7 run (Gerela kick)
 Pittsburgh – Stallworth 15 pass from Bradshaw (Gerela kick)

Week 2 (Sunday September 25, 1977): vs. Oakland Raiders  

at Three Rivers Stadium, Pittsburgh, Pennsylvania

 Game time: 4:00 pm EDT
 Game weather: 67 F, wind 9 mph
 Game attendance: 50,398
 Referee: Pat Haggerty
 TV announcers: (NBC) Curt Gowdy (play by play), John Brodie (color commentator)

Scoring drives:

 Oakland – FG Mann 21
 Oakland – FG Mann 40
 Oakland – FG Mann 41
 Oakland – van Eeghen 8 run (Mann kick)
 Pittsburgh – Cunningham 43 pass from Bradshaw (Gerela kick)

Week 3 at Browns

Week 4 (Sunday October 9, 1977): at Houston Oilers  

at Astrodome, Houston, Texas

 Game time: 2:00 pm EDT
 Game attendance: 49,226
 Referee: Dick Jorgensen
 TV announcers: (NBC) Jack Buck (play by play), Jimmy Johnson (color commentator)

Scoring drives:

 Houston – Burrough 44 pass from Coleman (Fritsch kick)
 Pittsburgh – FG Gerela 27
 Pittsburgh – Bleier 1 run (Gerela kick)
 Houston – FG Fritsch 27
 Houston – Johnson 51 pass from Pastorini (Fritsch kick)
 Houston – Stemrick 5 fumble recovery return (Fritsch kick)
 Houston – FG Fritsch 18

Week 5 (Monday October 17, 1977): vs. Cincinnati Bengals  

at Three Rivers Stadium, Pittsburgh, Pennsylvania

 Game time: 9:00 pm EDT
 Game weather: 39 F, wind 18 mph
 Game attendance: 47,950
 Referee: Ben Dreith
 TV announcers: (ABC) Frank Gifford (play by play) and Don Meredith (color commentator) 

Scoring drives:

 Pittsburgh – Bleier 1 run (Gerela kick)
 Pittsburgh – Bleier 2 run (kick failed)
 Cincinnati – Bujnoch 4 run (Bahr kick)
 Pittsburgh – Thornton 1 run (Gerela kick)
 Cincinnati – Williams recovered blocked punt in end zone (Bahr kick)

Week 6 (Sunday October 23, 1977): vs. Houston Oilers  

at Three Rivers Stadium, Pittsburgh, Pennsylvania

 Game time: 1:00 pm EDT
 Game weather: 50 F, wind 12 mph
 Game attendance: 48,517
 Referee: Bernie Ulman
 TV announcers: (NBC) Stu Nahan (play by play), Andy Russell (color commentator)

Scoring drives:

 Houston – Barber 5 pass from Pastorini (Fritsch kick)
 Pittsburgh – Harris 1 run (Gerela kick)
 Pittsburgh – Stallworth 49 pass from Bradshaw (kick failed)
 Houston – FG Fritsch 46
 Pittsburgh – Cunningham 2 pass from Bradshaw (Gerela kick)
 Pittsburgh – Harris 1 run (Gerela kick)

Week 7 (Sunday October 30, 1977): at Baltimore Colts  

at Memorial Stadium, Baltimore, Maryland

 Game time: 4:00 pm EST
 Game weather: 53 F, wind 8 mph
 Game attendance: 60,225
 Referee: Red Cashion
 TV announcers: (NBC) Marv Albert (play by play), Len Dawson (color commentator)

Scoring drives:

 Baltimore – FG Linhart 24
 Baltimore – Leaks 26 pass from Jones (Linhart kick)
 Baltimore – Mitchell 13 pass from Jones (Linhart kick)
 Baltimore – Lee 25 run (Linhart kick)
 Pittsburgh – Swann 32 pass from Bradshaw (Gerela kick)
 Baltimore – Jones 6 run (Linhart kick)
 Pittsburgh – Harris 11 run (Gerela kick)
 Pittsburgh – Harris 3 run (Gerela kick)

Week 8 (Sunday November 6, 1977): at Denver Broncos  

at Mile High Stadium, Denver, Colorado

 Game time: 4:00 pm EST
 Game weather: 52 F, wind 7 mph
 Game attendance: 74,967
 Referee: Fred Wyant
 TV announcers: (NBC) Jim Simpson (play by play), Merlin Olsen (color commentator)

Scoring drives:

 Denver – Lytle 1 run (Turner kick)
 Denver – Upchurch 87 punt return (Turner kick)
 Denver – Moses 20 pass from Morton (Turner kick)
 Pittsburgh – Stallworth 4 pass from Bradshaw (Gerela kick)

Week 9 (Sunday November 13, 1977): vs. Cleveland Browns  

at Three Rivers Stadium, Pittsburgh, Pennsylvania

 Game time: 1:00 pm EST
 Game weather: 30 F, wind 13 mph
 Game attendance: 47,055
 Referee: Pat Haggerty
 TV announcers: (NBC) Jim Simpson (play by play), Merlin Olsen (color commentator)

Scoring drives:

 Cleveland – FG Cockroft 44
 Pittsburgh – Swann 39 pass from Bradshaw (Gerela kick)
 Pittsburgh – Bleier 2 run (Gerela kick)
 Pittsburgh – Stallworth 38 pass from Bradshaw (Gerela kick)
 Pittsburgh – Harris 16 run (Gerela kick)
 Cleveland – Miller 5 run (Cockroft kick)
 Pittsburgh – Stallworth 9 pass from Bradshaw (Gerela kick)
 Cleveland – Poole 5 pass from Mays (Cockroft kick)
 Cleveland – Poole 13 pass from Mays (Cockroft kick)
 Cleveland – Poole 3 pass from Mays (Cockroft kick)

Week 10 (Sunday November 20, 1977): vs. Dallas Cowboys  

at Three Rivers Stadium, Pittsburgh, Pennsylvania

 Game time: 4:00 pm EST
 Game weather: 48 F, wind 9 mph
 Game attendance: 49,761
 Referee: Bob Frederic
 TV announcers: (CBS) Pat Summerall (play by play), Tom Brookshier (color commentator)

Scoring drives:

 Dallas – Dorsett 13 run (kick blocked)
 Pittsburgh – Harris 61 run (Gerela kick)
 Dallas – Saldi 23 pass from Staubach (Herrera kick)
 Pittsburgh – Swann 9 pass from Bradshaw  (Gerela kick)
 Pittsburgh – Stallworth 28 pass from Bradshaw  (Gerela kick)
 Pittsburgh – Harris 2 run (Gerela kick)

Week 11 at Jets

Week 12 (Sunday December 4, 1977): vs. Seattle Seahawks  

at Three Rivers Stadium, Pittsburgh, Pennsylvania

 Game time: 1:00 pm EST
 Game weather: 33 F, wind 7 mph
 Game attendance: 45,429
 Referee: Cal Lepore
 TV announcers: (NBC) Sam Nover (play by play), Mike Haffner (color commentator)

Scoring drives:

 Pittsburgh – Bradshaw 5 run (Gerela kick)
 Seattle – FG Leypoldt 20
 Pittsburgh – FG Gerela 22
 Pittsburgh – FG Gerela 28
 Seattle – McCullum 65 pass from Zorn (Leypoldt kick)
 Pittsburgh – FG Gerela 43
 Pittsburgh – Swann 22 pass from Bradshaw (Gerela kick)
 Pittsburgh – Bradshaw 3 run (Gerela kick)
 Seattle – Largent 30 pass from Zorn (Leypoldt kick)

Week 13 (Saturday December 10, 1977): at Cincinnati Bengals  

at Riverfront Stadium, Cincinnati

 Game time: 1:00 pm EST
 Game weather: 0° F, wind 12 mph
 Game attendance: 36,133
 Referee: Jim Tunney
 TV announcers: (NBC) Curt Gowdy (play by play), John Brodie (color commentator)

Scoring drives:

 Cincinnati – Parrish 47 interception return (Bahr kick)
 Pittsburgh – Harris 5 run (Gerela kick)
 Pittsburgh – FG Gerela 32
 Cincinnati – FG Bahr 24
 Cincinnati – McInally 43 pass from Anderson (Bahr kick)

Week 14 (Sunday December 18, 1977): at San Diego Chargers  

at San Diego Stadium, San Diego, California

 Game time: 4:00 pm EST
 Game weather: 63 F, wind 12 mph
 Game attendance: 50,727
 Referee: Ben Dreith
 TV announcers: (NBC) Charlie Jones (play by play), Andy Russell (color commentator)

Scoring drives:

 San Diego – C. Williams 2 run (kick failed)
 San Diego – FG Benirschke 38
 Pittsburgh – Thornton 1 run (Gerela kick)
 Pittsburgh – FG Gerela 27

Standings

Postseason

Game summary

AFC Divisional Playoff (Saturday December 24, 1977): at Denver Broncos  

at Mile High Stadium, Denver, Colorado

 Game time: 4:00 pm EST
 Game weather: 44 F, wind 17 mph
 Game attendance: 75,059
 Referee: Gene Barth
 TV announcers: (NBC) Jim Simpson (play by play), Merlin Olsen (color commentator)
 Denver – Lytle 7 run (Turner kick)
 Pittsburgh – Bradshaw 1 run (Gerela kick)
 Denver – Armstrong 10 run (Turner kick)
 Pittsburgh – Harris 1 run (Gerela kick)
 Denver – Odoms 30 pass from Morton (Turner kick)
 Pittsburgh – Brown 1 pass from Bradshaw (Gerela kick)
 Denver – FG Turner 44
 Denver – FG Turner 25
 Denver – Dolbin 34 pass from Morton (Turner kick)

See also
List of NFL teams affected by internal conflict

References

External links
 1977 Pittsburgh Steelers season at Profootballreference.com 
 1977 Pittsburgh Steelers season statistics at jt-sw.com 

Pittsburgh Steelers seasons
Pittsburgh Steelers
AFC Central championship seasons
Pittsburgh Steel